Chilliwack—Hope is a federal electoral district in the Fraser Valley region of British Columbia.

Chilliwack—Hope was created by the 2012 federal electoral boundaries redistribution and was legally defined in the 2013 representation order. It came into effect upon the call of the 42nd Canadian federal election, scheduled for October 2015. It was created out of 76% of the electoral district of Chilliwack—Fraser Canyon.

Demographics

According to the Canada 2011 Census; 2013 representation

Ethnic groups: 86.0% White, 9.2% Aboriginal, 1.0% South Asian 
Languages: 87.8% English, 3.2% German, 2.0% Dutch, 1.6% French 
Religions: 55.5% Christian (13.1% Catholic, 5.8% United Church, 4.0% Anglican, 2.3% Lutheran, 2.2% Pentecostal, 2.0% Baptist, 1.3% Presbyterian, 24.8% Other), 42.0% No religion 
Median income (2010): $26,035 
Average income (2010): $34,587

Riding associations 
Riding associations are the local branches of political parties:

Members of Parliament

This riding has elected the following members of the House of Commons of Canada:

Election results

Notes

References

British Columbia federal electoral districts
Politics of Chilliwack